The King of Staten Island is a 2020 American comedy-drama film directed by Judd Apatow, from a screenplay by Apatow, Pete Davidson, and Dave Sirus. It stars Davidson, Marisa Tomei, Bill Burr, Bel Powley, Maude Apatow, and Steve Buscemi, and follows a young man who must get his life together after his mother starts dating a new man who, like his deceased father, is a firefighter.

The film was announced as Apatow's next project in early 2019, with the cast joining that April. Filming took place around New York City in June and July. The film has been called a "semi-biographical" take on the life of Davidson, whose father was a New York City firefighter who died in service during the September 11 attacks and who has had his own battles with mental illness.

Originally intended to be theatrically released in the United States, the film was released digitally via Premium VOD on June 12, 2020, by Universal Pictures. It received generally positive reviews from critics, who praised Davidson's performance and Apatow's handling of the mature subject matter, but criticized its length.

Plot
Scott Carlin is a 24-year-old high school dropout, living with his mother Margie and his sister Claire in Staten Island. His firefighter father Stan died fighting a fire when he was seven, a loss that continues to affect him; he also deals with numerous medical problems, including Crohn's disease and ADD, and smokes marijuana constantly. Unemployed, he spends his days hanging out with his friends, including Kelsey, whom he is sleeping with. She wants the relationship to be more serious, but Scott fears commitment and that he is not good enough for her. Claire, who is leaving for college, is concerned his neuroses may grow out of control with her gone.

Scott dreams of being a tattoo artist and practices regularly on his friends, although his work is extremely inconsistent. One day, while hanging out with them at the beach, he is approached by 9-year-old Harold. He asks Scott to give him a tattoo, but runs off after getting a single line. Later, the boy's father, Ray, shows up at Scott's house.

Initially furious, Ray finds himself attracted to Margie and he eventually asks her on a date. Though she has not dated since Stan's death, she agrees. As things get more serious, Margie reveals their relationship to Scott, who is disturbed that he, like Stan, is a firefighter. Ray takes Scott to a Staten Island Yankees game with his co-workers but finds it difficult to talk to Scott, who argues that firefighters should not have families because of the pain that is caused by their deaths.

Margie and Ray give Scott an ultimatum to move out, which upsets him. While visiting Claire, Scott tells her he plans to break up their mom and Ray, as the relationship is 'unhealthy'. He gets a job as a busboy, and begins walking Harold and his sister Kelly to school each day, growing close with them. Meanwhile, Scott's friends plan to rob a pharmacy for oxycodone pills to sell. He's uncomfortable with the plan but agrees to be the lookout. The robbery goes awry when the pharmacist and his wife confront them. Oscar is shot and all three are arrested, but Scott flees.

Scott talks with Ray's ex-wife Gina, who tells him several negative things about Ray, painting him as a homeless gambling addict. He relays this to Margie, only to end up in a physical confrontation with Ray when he hears what Scott told her. A furious Margie kicks both men out.

With his friends in jail, Scott struggles to find a place to stay. He hopes that Kelsey will let him stay with her after they sleep together, but she is indignant when she recognizes his ulterior motives and refuses. Desperate, Scott goes to Ray's firehouse, where he is told he may stay in return for doing odd jobs. He gradually bonds with Ray and the other firefighters, who tell him stories about his father, which humanizes him and helps Scott accept his death. Ray learns from Harold that Scott is a talented artist, and agrees to let him tattoo his back as practice, but within certain limits.

One day, a man shows up at the firehouse with an abdominal wound while Scott is there alone. He takes him to the hospital, where Ray arrives, using his firefighter connections to get the man the help he needs. Margie, who works as an emergency room nurse, sees Scott and Ray and reconciles with them both. Ray shows Margie his tattoos; a number of them are offensive or violate Ray's criteria, but the most prominent is one of Margie, Ray, Scott, and Claire together (plus Scott's dad as the sun). Scott surprises Kelsey at the Staten Island Ferry, where she is heading into Manhattan to take a civil service exam. He rides on the ferry with her, where he confesses his love for her, and they kiss. Kelsey heads into the exam, asking him to wait for her.

Cast

Production
On January 29, 2019, it was announced that Universal Pictures was producing a new film directed by Judd Apatow and starring Pete Davidson. The film was set to be written by Apatow, Davidson, and Dave Sirus with Apatow and Sirus also producing the film. Davidson first came to Apatow's attention while working on Trainwreck after he was recommended by Amy Schumer, and he was cast in a cameo role in that film. The story is based in part on Davidson's life, depicting what it might have been like if he had not become a comedian.

In April 2019, Bel Powley, Bill Burr and Marisa Tomei were added to the cast. Maude Apatow and Pamela Adlon joined in May. In June 2019, Colson Baker, Jimmy Tatro, Ricky Velez, Steve Buscemi, Kevin Corrigan, Domenick Lombardozzi, Mike Vecchione, Moisés Arias, Lou Wilson and Derek Gaines joined the cast of the film.

Principal photography began June 3, 2019, in Staten Island and continued during June and July.

Release
The King of Staten Island was set to have its world premiere at South by Southwest on March 13, 2020, but the festival was cancelled due to the COVID-19 pandemic. It was rescheduled to premiere at the Tribeca Film Festival on April 20, 2020, which was also cancelled due to the pandemic. Originally scheduled for a theatrical release on June 19, 2020, the film was instead released digitally in the United States and Canada through Premium VOD on June 12, 2020 due to movie theaters closures that started in mid-March because of the pandemic restrictions. It was initially set to play in about 100 theaters, mostly drive-ins, beginning the same day as its VOD release, but Universal Pictures changed course after consulting the film's producers.

The film was released in cinemas in the Netherlands on June 25, 2020, France on July 22, Germany on July 30, and Spain on October 9. The film made $253,000 from 160 theaters in its Australian debut and $59,000 in New Zealand.

The film as of March 27, 2022 has sold an estimated $4.5 million in Theatrical and Home Markets, as well as an estimated $40 million in video-on-demand sales across various platforms.

Reception

VOD sales
In its debut weekend, The King of Staten Island was the most rented film on FandangoNow, Amazon Prime, the iTunes Store, Comcast Xfinity, Apple TV, Vudu, Google Play, YouTube, Spectrum, and DirecTV. It remained the top rented film across all platforms in second weekend, then on all but FandangoNow in its third. After a month of release, the film remained the number-one rented title on Prime, and in the top-five on all other platforms. In late-August, the price was lowered to $5.99 and it returned to the second-most rented movie on Fandango and third on Apple TV. In October 2020, The Hollywood Reporter said the film had generated $40 million in revenue for Universal up to that point. They also reported the film was the seventh-most popular PVOD title amid the COVID-19 pandemic.

Critical response
The site's critics consensus reads: "The King of Staten Islands uncertain tone and indulgent length blunt this coming-of-age dramedy's ability to find itself, but Pete Davidson's soulful performance holds it together." On Metacritic, the film has a weighted average score of 67 out of 100, based on 50 critics, indicating "generally favorable reviews".

Writing for the Chicago Sun-Times, Richard Roeper called the film "sharp and funny" and gave it three-and-a-half stars out of four, saying that "Davidson delivers a fully realized, nuanced performance, tackling dark comedy and raw drama with equal aplomb." David Ehrlich of IndieWire gave the film a "B+" and called it "a sweet and tender dramedy", writing: "Teetering between self-parody and something truly beautiful, Apatow's latest offers yet another shaggy portrait of permanent adolescence but this one — his best film since 2009's Funny People — helps make sense of why he always keeps going back to the same archetype."

References

External links
 
 
 Script 

2020 comedy-drama films
2020 films
American comedy-drama films
Apatow Productions films
Films directed by Judd Apatow
Films scored by Michael Andrews
Films set in Staten Island
Films shot in New York City
Perfect World Pictures films
September 11 attacks in popular culture
Universal Pictures films
2020s English-language films
Films about grieving
Films about depression
2020s American films
English-language comedy-drama films